Roundstone is a rural locality in the Shire of Banana, Queensland, Australia.

Road infrastructure
The Dawson Highway runs through the northern extremity, near Moura.

References 

Shire of Banana
Localities in Queensland